Robert Liebig was a German luger who competed in the late 1920s. He won a silver medal in the men's singles event at the 1929 European luge championships in Semmering, Austria.

References
List of European luge champions 

German male lugers
Year of birth missing
Year of death missing